Cincinnati is the home of three major league teams, three minor league teams, five college institutions with sports teams, and numerous top level amateur teams.

Current teams

Major League

Cincinnati Reds (MLB)
5 World Series
 1919
 1940
 1975
 1976
 1990

Cincinnati Bengals (NFL)
0 Super Bowls

FC Cincinnati (MLS)
0 MLS Cups

Minor League

Cincinnati Cyclones (ECHL)
2 Kelly Cups
 2008
 2010

Florence Y'alls (Frontier League)
0 Frontier Cups

FC Cincinnati 2 (MLS Next Pro)
0 MLS Next Pro Cups

Universities

University of Cincinnati Basketball (NCAA D1 Mens)
2 National Championships
 1961
 1962

Top tier amateur league teams

Venues 
 Paycor Stadium – Football (65,515)
 Great American Ball Park – Baseball (43,500)
 Nippert Stadium – D1 College Football (40,000)
 TQL Stadium – Soccer (26,000)
 Heritage Bank Center – Hockey (14,453)
 Fifth Third Arena – D1 College Basketball (12,012)
 Lindner Family Tennis Center – Tennis (Center Court: 11,435; Grandstand Court: 5,000)
 Cintas Center – D1 College Basketball (10,224)
 Truist Arena – D1 College Basketball (9,400)
 Thomas More Stadium – Baseball (4,500)

Other sporting events
The Western & Southern Open, one of the elite nine ATP World Tour Masters 1000 events, is hosted every August in the Cincinnati suburb of Mason across I-71 highway from Kings Island.

Miami University RedHawks: MAC is a Division 1 school located in Oxford, Ohio; 32 miles from downtown Cincinnati.

Kentucky Speedway is a former NASCAR racetrack located in Sparta, Kentucky; 42 miles from downtown Cincinnati.

The Flying Pig Marathon is an annual marathon which winds through downtown Cincinnati and Northern Kentucky.

The Chili Bowl (Cincinnati) is an annual college football bowl game beginning at TQL Stadium in 2023.

Recreation
Sports Plus - Cincinnati's Premier Sports Facility is home to two ice sheets that are home to both the Cincinnati Bearcats ice hockey team and the Xavier Musketeers ice hockey team.  Sports Plus is also home to an inline hockey rink that has a large adult hockey league. There are also 6 basketball courts that host many tournaments, as well as youth and adult leagues.

Within the urban core of the city and its immediate surroundings, the Steps of Cincinnati offer an urban hiking experience.

Cincinnati and the surrounding metropolitan area has a multitude of disc golf courses.

Former professional teams

American Football
 Cincinnati Bengals (1937–1941), a member of the American Football League (1936). Competed in AFL II (1937), the minor AFL of 1938 (1939), and AFL III (1939-1940).
 Cincinnati Celts, played in the unofficial "Ohio League" and the American Professional Football Association (renamed the National Football League in 1922).
 Cincinnati Reds (NFL), NFL team that played in the 1933 NFL season and the first eight games of the 1934 NFL season.
 Cincinnati Models, team that competed in the Midwest Football League (1935–1940), 1936-1937
 Cincinnati Treslers, team that competed in the Midwest Football League (1935–1940), 1937
 Cincinnati Blades, team that competed in the Midwest Football League (1935–1940), 1938
 Cincinnati Rockers, Arena Football, team that competed in the Arena Football League from 1992–1993.
 Cincinnati Swarm, Arena Football, af2, 2003
 Cincinnati Marshals, Indoor Football, National Indoor Football League, 2004-2006
 Cincinnati Jungle Kats, Arena Football, af2, 2007
 Cincinnati Commandos, Indoor Football, Continental Indoor Football League, 2010-2011, Ultimate Indoor Football League, 2012
 Northern Kentucky River Monsters, Indoor Football, Ultimate Indoor Football League, 2011, Continental Indoor Football League, 2014

Basketball
 Cincinnati Royals, NBA team 1957-1972, *Considered a Major League Franchise at the Time*
 Cincinnati Slammers, Continental Basketball Association team 1984-1987

Ice Hockey
 Cincinnati Stingers, World Hockey Association, 1975-1979, *Considered a Major League Franchise at the Time*
 Cincinnati Mighty Ducks, American Hockey League, 1997-2005
 Cincinnati Stingers, Central Hockey League (Minor League), 1979-1980
 Cincinnati Mohawks, American Hockey League, 1949-1952, International Hockey League, 1952-1958
 Cincinnati Wings, Central Professional Hockey League, 1963-1964
 Cincinnati Swords, American Hockey League, 1971-1974
 Cincinnati Tigers (ice hockey), Central Hockey League, 1981-1982

Soccer
 Cincinnati Kids, Major Indoor Soccer League, 1978-1979 
 Cincinnati Riverhawks, Professional Soccer, USISL PDL (1997), USL A-League, (1998–2003)
 Cincinnati Silverbacks, Professional Indoor Soccer NPSL, 1995-1998
 Cincinnati Excite, Professional Indoor Soccer, American Indoor Soccer League, 2004-2008
 Cincinnati Kings Indoor Team, Professional Indoor Soccer, Professional Arena Soccer League, 2008-2013
 Cincinnati Saints, Professional Indoor Soccer, Professional Arena Soccer League, 2013-2014
 FC Cincinnati, Professional Soccer, USL, 2016-2018 (Promoted to MLS)

Softball
 Cincinnati Suds, APSPL, USPL, 1977-1982
 Cincinnati Rivermen, NASL, 1980

Ultimate Frisbee
 Cincinnati Revolution, American Ultimate Disc League, 2013-2016

References

External links
 https://www.sportsplusohio.com/
 http://www.cincinnati.com/story/sports/2015/08/11/source-cincy--getting--new-pro-soccer-team/31456919/?
Sun, July, 4, 1943, Dayton Daily Daily News, p. 16. “Cincinnati Clocks, Bombers Play Here Sunday”